Maria Dalmazzo (born October 5, 1983) is a Colombian actress.

Early life and education 

Maria Dalmazzo was born in Valparaiso, Chile, daughter of a Chilean/Italian father and a Colombian mother, the last of two siblings. When she was five years old they moved to Pereira, Colombia, where she lived for several years at a zoo where her father was the resident head veterinarian. She studied there. When she turned 11, she decided to start studying Dramatic Arts in the after-class schedule. Simultaneously she began working in advertising as a teen model. She also began to study musical theory and took up various instruments, such as guitar and violin. At 14 she took an interest in producing and writing plays for the school drama class, and three years later she worked in El Valle de las Sombras, a theatrical piece that would take her on a national tour.

Career
Upon high school graduation she studied environmental engineering. Shortly before finishing her undergraduate program she decided to leave not only school but also the city, and then she moved to Bogotá where, three days after her arrival, she started working in advertising, modelling and doing locutions. She worked in several ad campaigns for Colgate, Neutrogena, Johnson & Johnson, Lancôme, Sony, and more. She also made movie dubs. She worked with Disney Latin America doing Meet & Greets along all the southern continent, voiced over several documentaries and has been the voice for important products in Colombia.

Films 
 2010: Apatía “Una Película de Carretera”
 2010: Paulina
 2009: Diástole
 2008: A Solas

Television 
 2012: Pobres Rico
 2011: Kdabra2
 2010: Kdabra
 2010: La Magia de Sofia
 2010: A Corazón Abierto
 2008–2009: La Sub30
 2006–2007: Historias de Hombres Sólo Para Mujeres
 2004: La Mujer en el Espejo
 2002: Juan Joyita
 2000–2005: Así es la Vida
 2000: Programa Coctel

Theatre 
 2007: Lujuria
 2003: El Sardinero
 2000–2002: El Valle de las Sombras

External links
 http://mariadalmazzo.wordpress.com

1983 births
Living people
21st-century Colombian actresses
Colombian female models
People from Valparaíso
Chilean emigrants to Colombia
Colombian film actresses
Colombian stage actresses
Colombian television actresses
Colombian people of Chilean descent